Kurakh is a rural locality (a selo) and the administrative center of Kurakhsky District of the Republic of Dagestan, Russia. Population: . The Russian Officer Georgy Bergmann was born in Kurakh.

References

Notes

Sources

Rural localities in Kurakhsky District